Barbara Britton (born Barbara Maurine Brantingham, September 26, 1920 – January 17, 1980) was an American film and television actress. She is best known for her Western film roles opposite Randolph Scott, Joel McCrea, and Gene Autry and for her two-year tenure as inquisitive amateur sleuth Pam North on the television and radio series Mr. and Mrs. North.

Early life
Britton was born September 26, 1920, in Long Beach, California. Her involvement with stage productions began when she was 14. She attended Polytechnic High School and Long Beach City College, majoring in speech with the intention of working as a speech and drama teacher. While in school, she began to show an interest in acting and working on local stage productions.  Britton was a Republican, and she campaigned for Dwight D. Eisenhower in both 1952 and 1956.

Career
In 1941, while appearing in a Pasadena Tournament of Roses Parade, a photo of Britton was used on the front page of a local newspaper. A talent scout took notice, and she was soon signed to a Paramount Pictures contract. (Another source says that a talent scout spotted her as the lead in the production of The Old Maid at her college, and "three weeks later she was signed by Paramount Pictures as a stock player.")

Film
That same year, she appeared in her first two films: the William Boyd Western Secret of the Wastelands and Louisiana Purchase starring Bob Hope. Her first major film appearance was in a small role in the John Wayne film Reap the Wild Wind (1942).  In 1944, she gave a very affecting performance with Ray Milland in Till We Meet Again.

During the 1940s Britton starred in three films for which she is most recognized today, two of which co-starred Randolph Scott. The first was the 1945 film Captain Kidd with Scott, followed by The Virginian in 1946 opposite Joel McCrea. The third was the 1947 Randolph Scott film Gunfighters. She teamed with Scott again in the 1948 Western Albuquerque, and that same year she starred opposite Gene Autry in Loaded Pistols. In total, she starred or appeared in 26 films during that decade.

Television
Britton starred in the 1950s television show Mr. and Mrs. North, a Thin Man-like mystery show, with Richard Denning and Francis De Sales. She was probably best known for being the spokeswoman for Revlon products in the 1950s and 1960s, appearing in advertisements and commercials that included live spots on The $64,000 Question. She also portrayed Laura Petrie in Carl Reiner's Head of the Family, the 1959 pilot for the later Dick Van Dyke Show.

One of Britton's last roles was on the daytime television soap opera One Life to Live in 1979.

Magazines
Over a 24-month span, Britton's picture appeared on more than 100 magazine covers, including those of Ladies Home Journal, Woman's Home Companion, and McCall's. In 1949, a newspaper article reported, "Today, Barbara Britton's picture has appeared on more national magazine covers than any other motion picture actress in the world."

Personal life

Reportedly, in 1944, Britton suffered from nervous exhaustion due to overwork and was advised to seek the help of physician and psychoanalyst Dr. Eugene J. Czukor. Britton and Czukor, who was 22 years her senior, were married on April 2, 1945. At one time, the couple had a home on Victoria Drive in Laguna Beach, California. They moved to Manhattan in 1957. For many years, Britton and her husband lived in a rambling, red-shingled farmhouse in Bethel, Connecticut. Sharing their love of antiques, they opened a shop in an early American barn in the antique-gallery enclave of Woodbury, Connecticut. They had two children, Ted and Christina. Their marriage lasted for 34 years until Britton's death. She died of pancreatic cancer at her Manhattan apartment on January 17, 1980, at the age of 59.

Honors and awards
In 1948, Britton was given a key to the City of Long Beach, California. On February 8, 1960, she received a star for television on the Hollywood Walk of Fame; her star is located at 1719 Vine Street.

Filmography

Films

 Secrets of the Wasteland (1941) - Jennifer Kendall
 Louisiana Purchase (1941) - Louisiana Belle
 The Fleet's In (1942) - Eileen Wright
 Reap the Wild Wind (1942) - Charleston Lady
 Beyond the Blue Horizon (1942) - Pamela, Girl at Circus (uncredited)
 Wake Island (1942) - Sally Cameron (uncredited)
 Mrs. Wiggs of the Cabbage Patch (1942) - Miss Lucy Olcott
 Freedom Comes High (1943, Short) - Ellen Blanding
 Young and Willing (1943) - Marge Benson Dennison
 So Proudly We Hail! (1943) - Lt. Rosemary Larson
 The Story of Dr. Wassell (1944) - Ruth
 Till We Meet Again (1944) - Sister Clothilde aka Louise Dupree
 The Great John L. (1945) - Kathy Harkness
 Captain Kidd (1945) - Lady Anne Dunstan
 The Virginian (1946) - Molly Wood
 They Made Me a Killer (1946) - June Reynolds
 The Fabulous Suzanne (1946) - Suzanne
 The Return of Monte Cristo (1946) - Angel Picard
 Gunfighters (1947) - Bess Banner
 Albuquerque (1948) - Letty Tyler
 Mr. Reckless (1948) - Betty Denton
 The Untamed Breed (1948) - Cherry Lucas
 Loaded Pistols (1948) - Mary Evans
 I Shot Jesse James (1949) - Cynthy
 Cover Up (1949) - Anita Weatherby
 Champagne for Caesar (1950) - Gwenn Bottomley
 The Bandit Queen (1950) - Zara Montalvo aka Lola Belmont
 The Raiders (1952) - Elizabeth Ainsworth
 Ride the Man Down (1952) - Lottie Priest
 Bwana Devil (1952) - Alice Hayward
 Dragonfly Squadron (1954) - Donna Cottrell
 Ain't Misbehavin' (1955) - Pat Beaton
 Night Freight (1955) - Wanda
 The Spoilers (1955) - Helen Chester
 Majeok (1967)

Television series

 Armstrong Circle Theatre (1950–1951)
 Pulitzer Prize Playhouse (1951)
 Lux Video Theatre (1951) - Hilda
 Lights Out (1951)
 Cameo Theatre (1951)
 Schlitz Playhouse (1952) - Pamela
 Mr. and Mrs. North (1952–1954) - Pamela North / Kitty Pomeroy
 Danger (1954)
 Climax! (1955) - Duana Clarke
 Appointment with Adventure (1955)
 Robert Montgomery Presents (1950–1955) - Liz
 The Christophers (1955)
 The Ford Television Theatre (1955) - Alice / Kathy Collins
 Head of the Family (Pilot for what would become The Dick Van Dyke Show) (1959)
 The Comedy Spot (1960) - Laura Petrie
 One Life to Live (1968) - Fran Craig Gordon #1 (1979-1980) (final appearance)

Radio
 Stars in the Air (1952) Episode: Weekend for Three
 Mr. and Mrs. North (1953-1955)

References

External links

 
 
 
 

American television actresses
American film actresses
Deaths from cancer in New York (state)
Deaths from pancreatic cancer
Long Beach City College alumni
1920 births
1980 deaths
20th-century American actresses
Paramount Pictures contract players
Actresses from Long Beach, California
Long Beach Polytechnic High School alumni